Wesley J. Smith (born 1949) is an American lawyer and author, a Senior Fellow at the Discovery Institute's Center on Human Exceptionalism, a politically conservative non-profit think tank. He is also a consultant for the Patients Rights Council. Smith is known for his criticism of animal rights, environmentalism, assisted suicide and utilitarian bioethics. He is also the host of the Humanize podcast. 

Smith has authored or co-authored fourteen books. He formerly collaborated with consumer advocate Ralph Nader, and has been published in regional and national outlets such as The New York Times, Newsweek, The Wall Street Journal, USA Today, the San Francisco Chronicle, The Seattle Times, the New York Post, and others.  He is also well known for his blog, "Human Exceptionalism", hosted by National Review, which advances his theory of "human exceptionalism" and defends intrinsic human dignity. He is a critic of those he labels "mainstream" bioethicists such as Peter Singer, Julian Savulescu, Jacob M. Appel, and R. Alta Charo.  He has also been highly critical of science writer Matt Ridley.

Biography
Smith practiced law in the San Fernando Valley from 1976–1985, at which time he left law practice to pursue other interests, particularly as a public policy advocate. His first book in 1987 was The Lawyer Book: A Nuts and Bolts Guide to Client Survival, introduced by consumer advocate Ralph Nader beginning a collaboration between the two men. Smith is a prolific author and a frequent contributor to National Review and The Weekly Standard. He closely followed the Terri Schiavo case in 2005, and wrote frequently on the topic.

He opposes policies allowing for assisted suicide, euthanasia, human cloning, and granting human style "rights" to animals," making a clear distinction between animal rights and animal welfare. He is also a noted critic of mainstream views in bioethics, human cloning research, radical environmentalism and of what he calls the radical animal liberation movement, which he worries exhibits "anti-humanism". His book Culture of Death: The Assault on Medical Ethics in America was named Best Health Book of the Year at the 2001 Independent Publishers Book Awards.

Smith's 2010 book A Rat is a Pig is a Dog is a Boy is an anti-animal rights work which defends factory farming and human exceptionalism. Smith is one of the world's foremost apologists of "human exceptionalism," which he defends from a secular perspective.

Smith is a frequent guest on radio and television talk shows, having appeared on national programs such as Good Morning America and Nightline, as well as internationally on BBC Radio 4. He has testified as an expert witness in front of federal and state legislative committees, and is an international public speaker, appearing throughout the United States, Canada, Australia, South Africa, and many countries in Europe.

Smith is married to the syndicated Las Vegas Review-Journal White House correspondent Debra J. Saunders.

Criticism

In a 2001 essay, physician Matthew K. Wynia and attorney Arthur Derse accused Smith of selectively using evidence to create a false impression that bioethics is a monolithic field. They argued that Smith was "prepared to bend the truth to make a point, turn a stomach, and potentially radicalize a reader." Smith rebutted these criticisms, stating in part, "Wynia and Derse assert that I claim bioethics is a monolith. That is not what I write. What I do believe is that bioethics has, generally, crystallized into an orthodoxy, perhaps even an ideology. I acknowledge that disagreements certainly exist within the field. But I view them, with some exceptions, as the arguing of people who agree on fundamentals but disagree on details -- sort of like Catholics bickering with Baptists."

Sociologist John Sorenson has negatively reviewed Smith's book A Rat is a Pig is a Dog is a Boy as a "misleading, bad-faith compendium of anti-animal rights 
propaganda, based on a single idea: human exceptionalism". Sorenson criticized Smith for ignoring the negative environmental effects of factory farming including habitat destruction and loss of biodiversity from deforestation. Philosopher Angus Taylor noted that Smith has "little familiarity with the large range of literature on the moral status of animals". In contrast, in the book's preface, novelist Dean Koontz wrote: "Among other things, this book is a rational, reasonable argument for the  need to accept the nuanced complexity of the world and to resist the dangerous simplifications of antihuman ideologies."

Bibliography
 The Lawyer Book: A Nuts and Bolts Guide to Client Survival Price Stern Sloan Publishers, 1987, 
 The Doctor Book: A Nuts and Bolts Guide to Patient Power Price Stern Sloan Publishers, 1988, 
 The Senior Citizen's Handbook: A Nuts and Bolts Guide to More Comfortable Living Price Stern Sloan Publishers, 1989, 
 Winning the Insurance Game (1990) Ralph Nader and Wesley J. Smith, 
 The Frugal Shopper (1991) Ralph Nader and Wesley J. Smith, 
 Collision Course: The Truth About Airline Safety (1993) Ralph Nader and Wesley J. Smith, 
 No Contest: Corporate Lawyers and the Perversion of Justice in America (1996) Random House, Ralph Nader and Wesley J. Smith, 
 Forced Exit: The Slippery Slope from Assisted Suicide to Legalized Murder (1997), 
 Forced Exit: Euthanasia, Assisted Suicide, and the New Duty to Die (2006) Encounter Books, 
 Culture of Death: The Assault on Medical Ethics in America (2001), Encounter Books, 
 Power Over Pain, Eric M. Chevlen, MD and Wesley J. Smith, 2002, 
 Consumer’s Guide to a Brave New World (2005), Encounter Books, 
 A Rat is a Pig is a Dog is a Boy: The Human Cost of the Animal Rights Movement (2010) Encounter Books, 
 The War on Humans (2014)
 Culture of Death: The Age of "Do Harm" Medicine (2016)

See also
 Bioethics
 The President's Council on Bioethics
 Stem Cell Research
 Euthanasia
 Assisted Suicide
 Animal liberation movement
 Human exceptionalism
 Baxter v. Montana

References

External links
 Humanize podcast
 Human Exceptionalism Blog
 Discovery Institute's Bioethics Program
 Lecture on Euthanasia at Princeton (downloads file)
 Lecture: "Why Being Human Matters," presented August 16, 2007 at the Discovery Institute
 Audio interview with Smith at National Review Online

1949 births
Living people
American lawyers
Bioethicists
Critics of animal rights
Critics of vegetarianism
Discovery Institute fellows and advisors
Environmental skepticism
Intelligent design advocates